Bursaria calcicola is a species of flowering plant in the family Pittosporaceae and is endemic to a restricted area near Wombeyan Caves in New South Wales. It is a spiny, hairy, erect or sprawling shrub with clustered, narrowly elliptic to egg-shaped leaves, white flowers with triangular sepals, cream-coloured petals and flattened fruit.

Description
The five stamens are free from each other, with the filament much shorter than the anthers, and the pistil is hairy and white. Flowering occurs in late spring and the fruit is a flattened capsule  in diameter.

Taxonomy
Bursaria calcicola was first formally described in 1999 by Lindy W. Cayzer, Michael Crisp and Ian Telford in the journal Australian Systematic Botany from specimens collected by Cayzer in Wombeyan Caves Reserve. The specific epithet (calcicola) means "limestone-dweller".

Distribution and habitat
This bursaria is only known from the Wombeyan Caves area where it grows in woodland on soils derived from limestone.

References

calcicola
Pittosporaceae
Plants described in 1999
Flora of New South Wales